Destiny Watford  is an American environmental activist. She won a Goldman Environmental Prize in 2016.

Biography 
Watford was raised in Curtis Bay, Maryland, in an area with significant air pollution. While in high school, she started an advocacy campaign against an incinerator project that had been approved by the city and state, and could burn 4,000 tons of waste per day. Over four years, she led advocacy with other students at Benjamin Franklin High School based on concerns about the health impacts from more air pollution in the area, including the prevalence of asthma already experienced in the local community. Their work included research into land use and zoning policies, as well as lobbying school and government officials. In 2016, the Maryland Department of the Environment canceled the incinerator project.

She studied at Towson University. In 2018, she presented at the Facing Race Conference. At age 16, she co-founded the advocacy group Free Your Voice, which is now part of the human rights organization United Workers.

Awards and recognition 
Watford has received a variety of awards and accolades, including the Goldman Environmental Prize in 2016, as well as recognition as a Birdland Community Hero in 2016, Time Next Generation Leader 2016, and Essence Work 100 Woman.

Public speaking 
Watford is a regular keynote speaker on environmentalism and environmental justice. Speaking credits include:

 Speaker at 2017 TEDxMidAtlantic
 Speaker at Facing Race National Conference 2018
 Keynote at 2018 University of Maryland Environmental Justice and Health Disparities Symposium
 Keynote at 2019 New Mexico Clean Energy Conference 
 Keynote at 2019 Celebrating ‘The Power of 10’ Towson University Conference

References

External links 
 Destiny Watford: How one student activist helped her community stop a polluting incinerator | TED Talk, 2017

People from Baltimore
Living people
American environmentalists
Goldman Environmental Prize awardees
Towson University alumni
Year of birth missing (living people)